Broken Pencil is a Canadian magazine based in Toronto, which profiles zine culture, independent arts and music. It was founded in 1995 and publishes four times annually.

History 
The magazine was founded in 1995 by Hal Niedzviecki. Its current editor is Jonathan Valelly.

In 2009, Broken Pencil published a collection of short stories entitled Can'tLit: Fearless Fiction from Broken Pencil Magazine, featuring Canadian independent writers with ECW Press. In 2015, The Toronto Star published an article about the first 20 years of Broken Pencil and its role in zine publishing in Canada.

References

External links
 Official website

1995 establishments in Ontario
Literary magazines published in Canada
Magazines established in 1995
Magazines published in Toronto
Quarterly magazines published in Canada